Hipposideros is one of the most diverse genera of bats, with more than 70 species.  They are collectively called roundleaf bats after the shape of their nasal ornament. It is the type genus of the family Hipposideridae. It is divided into species groups based on morphology.

Species included in this genus are

armiger species group
Great roundleaf bat, H. armiger
Ha Long roundleaf bat, H. alongensis
Pendlebury's roundleaf bat, H. pendlebury
Lesser great leaf-nosed bat, H. turpis

bicolor species group
Dusky leaf-nosed bat, H. ater
Benito roundleaf bat, H. beatus
Bicolored roundleaf bat, H. bicolor
Short-headed roundleaf bat, H. breviceps
Sundevall's roundleaf bat, H. caffer
Spurred roundleaf bat, H. calcaratus
Fawn leaf-nosed bat, H. cervinus
Ashy roundleaf bat, H. cineraceus
Large Mindanao roundleaf bat, H. coronatus
Cox's roundleaf bat, H. coxi
Timor roundleaf bat, H. crumeniferus
Short-tailed roundleaf bat, H. curtus
Borneo roundleaf bat, H. doriae
Khajuria's leaf-nosed bat, H. durgadasi
Dayak roundleaf bat, H. dyacorum
Sooty roundleaf bat, H. fuliginosus
Fulvus roundleaf bat, H. fulvus
Cantor's roundleaf bat, H. galeritus
Thailand roundleaf bat, H. halophyllus
Kolar leaf-nosed bat, H. hypophyllus
Jones's roundleaf bat, H. jonesi
Phou Khao Khouay leaf-nosed bat, H. khaokhouayensis
Lamotte's roundleaf bat, H. lamottei
Big-eared roundleaf bat, H. macrobullatus
Maggie Taylor's roundleaf bat, H. maggietaylorae
Aellen's roundleaf bat, H. marisae
Malayan roundleaf bat, H. nequam
Philippine forest roundleaf bat, H. obscurus
Orbiculus leaf-nosed bat, H. orbiculus
Biak roundleaf bat, H. papua
Pomona roundleaf bat, H. pomona
Philippine pygmy roundleaf bat, H. pygmaeus
Ridley's leaf-nosed bat, H. ridleyi
Laotian leaf-nosed bat, H. rotalis
Noack's roundleaf bat, H. ruber

cyclops species group
Greater roundleaf bat, H. camerunensis
Telefomin roundleaf bat, H. corynophyllus
Cyclops roundleaf bat, H. cyclops
Hill's roundleaf bat, H. edwardshilli
Fly River roundleaf bat, H. muscinus
Semon's roundleaf bat, H. semoni
Northern leaf-nosed bat or narrow-eared roundleaf bat, H. stenotis

commersoni species group
Commerson's roundleaf bat, H. commersoni
Giant roundleaf bat, H. gigas
Saõ Tomé leaf-nosed bat, H. thomensis
Striped leaf-nosed bat, H. vittatus
Wollaston's roundleaf bat, H. wollastoni

diadema species group
Makira roundleaf bat, H. demissus
Diadem roundleaf bat, H. diadema
Fierce roundleaf bat, H. dinops
Crested roundleaf bat, H. inexpectatus
Arnhem leaf-nosed bat, H. inornatus
Indian roundleaf bat, H. lankadiva
Large Asian roundleaf bat, H. lekaguli
Peleng leaf-nosed bat, H. pelingensis

larvatus species group
Grand roundleaf bat, H. grandis
Intermediate roundleaf bat, H. larvatus
Maduran leaf-nosed bat, H. madurae
Sorensen's leaf-nosed bat, H. sorenseni
Sumba roundleaf bat or Sumban leaf-nosed bat, H. sumbae

megalotis species group
Ethiopian large-eared roundleaf bat, H. megalotis

pratti species group
Shield-faced roundleaf bat, H. lylei
Pratt's roundleaf bat, H. pratti
Swinhoe's roundleaf bat, H. swinhoei

speoris species group
Aba roundleaf bat, H. abae
Schneider's leaf-nosed bat, H. speoris

Uncertain group
Hipposideros besaoka
Boeadi’s roundleaf bat, H. boeadii
Sulawesi roundleaf bat, H. celebensis
Hipposideros cryptovalorona
Griffin's leaf-nosed bat, H. griffini
Khasian leaf-nosed bat, H. khasiana
Shield-nosed leaf-nosed bat H. scutinares
Hipposideros tephrus
House-dwelling leaf-nosed bat, H. einnaythu

Fossil species 
The species Hipposideros bernardsigei Hand, 1997 describes one of many species of bats discovered in the north of Australia, the Riversleigh fauna, and appears to be a member of an Australopapuan group in an early radiation of the genus. The first hipposiderid to be described from Pliocene deposits at Riversleigh was Hipposideros winsburyorum Hand, 1999. Other named fossil species allied to Hipposideros include Hipposideros (Pseudorhinolophus), Hipposideros collongensis, Hipposideros conquensis, Hipposideros felix, Hipposideros minor, Hipposideros morloti, Hipposideros omani and Hipposideros schlosseri.

References

 
Bat genera
Taxa named by John Edward Gray